is a Japanese karateka. At the 2018 World Karate Championships held in Madrid, Spain, she won the silver medal in the women's team kumite event. In 2018, she also won the gold medal in the women's team kumite event at the Asian Karate Championships held in Amman, Jordan.

At the 2019 Asian Karate Championships held in Tashkent, Uzbekistan, she also won the silver medal in the women's team kumite event. In 2021, she competed in the women's +68 kg event at the 2021 World Karate Championships held in Dubai, United Arab Emirates.

Achievements

References 

Living people
Year of birth missing (living people)
Place of birth missing (living people)
Japanese female karateka
21st-century Japanese women